There have been numerous sports games in the Mario franchise. Although originally a branch of the Mario sports games, the Mario Kart series is not included in this list, as it has since become a stand-alone series.

Mario Tennis series 
While Mario appeared in several tennis games preceding it, he first starred as a player in the Virtual Boy game Mario's Tennis, developed by Nintendo R&D1. Mario Tennis for the Nintendo 64 was the first to use the Mario Tennis branding. Most of the subsequent Nintendo home and handheld consoles have featured a game since. Like the Mario Golf series, all of the games are currently developed by Camelot Software Planning.

Mario Golf games 
As with tennis, Mario appeared in multiple golf games before appearing in a Mario-branded entry on the Nintendo 64. NES Open Tournament Golf was developed by Nintendo R&D2 and was the first sports game to feature Mario as a player. All subsequent golf games, beginning with Mario Golf for the Nintendo 64, have been published by Nintendo and developed by Camelot Software Planning.

Mario Strikers series 
The Mario Strikers franchise (Mario Football in PAL regions and Mario Soccer in South Korea) is a video game franchise that introduced association football to the Mushroom Kingdom. The series is developed by Next Level Games and began in 2005 for the GameCube with Super Mario Strikers.

Mario Baseball games 
The Mario Baseball series is a collection of video games based on baseball that takes place in the Mushroom Kingdom. The series is developed by Bandai Namco Entertainment.

Mario & Sonic at the Olympic Games series 

The Mario & Sonic at the Olympic Games series is a collection of games that take place during the Summer and Winter Olympic Games, crossing over characters from the Mario series with those from Sega's Sonic the Hedgehog franchise. It debuted in 2007 for the Wii with the Beijing 2008 edition, titled Mario & Sonic at the Olympic Games. Nintendo published the East Asian versions of the first three games and fully published the fourth and fifth games, while Sega published the Western versions of the first three games and fully published the sixth game, with Nintendo licensing characters.

Summer Olympic Games

Winter Olympic Games

Mario Sports series

Mario Pinball games

Other games

See also
 List of Mario racing games

Notes

References

External links 
 History of Mario Sports Games at GameSpot

Mario sports games
Mario sports games